WCXL (104.1 FM) is a 100,000-watt radio station broadcasting a hot adult contemporary music format. It is licensed to Kill Devil Hills, North Carolina, and serves the Outer Banks and Hampton Roads areas. The station is owned by Jam Media Solutions, LLC. Its studios are located in Nags Head, North Carolina, and transmitter facilities are located in Powells Point, North Carolina, near the Outer Banks. It dropped most of its satellite programming for live and local jocks in 2004.

The station has been showing up in Arbitron's ratings in the Hampton Roads market. It used to be owned by Ray-D-O Biz LLC. It was called WXAI from November 29, 1991 until was renamed on March 29, 1992. It had been known as "XL104." The 104.1 frequency had been tied up for eight years by three groups vying for it: East Carolina Radio, Coastal Broadcasting and Ray-D-O Biz. By the early 1990s, Ray-D-O biz got the frequency.

References
VARTV

External links
Official Site

CXL
Radio stations established in 1991
1991 establishments in North Carolina